Major Elliott Garrett (born August 24, 1962) is an American journalist who is chief Washington correspondent for CBS News. Garrett is the host of The Takeout podcast and was a correspondent for National Journal. Prior to joining National Journal, he was the senior White House correspondent for Fox News. He covered the 2004 presidential election, the War on terror, and the 2008 presidential election.

Early life and education
Garrett was born and raised in San Diego, California, where he attended James Madison High School. He graduated from the University of Missouri with a Bachelor of Journalism and a Bachelor of Science in political science in 1984. He is a member of Phi Gamma Delta.

Career
In the 1990s, Garrett was a senior editor and congressional correspondent for U.S. News & World Report and a congressional reporter for The Washington Times before joining CNN's White House team in early 2000 and Fox News in 2002 as a general assignment reporter. There, he covered the 2004 election and served as the network's congressional correspondent. He has also been a White House correspondent for CNN and an award-winning reporter across the country for the Houston Post, the Las Vegas Review-Journal, and the Amarillo Globe-News. His articles have appeared in such magazines as The Weekly Standard, Washington Monthly, and Mother Jones.

Garrett covered President Barack Obama's presidential campaign. On January 13, 2009, Garrett became the senior White House correspondent for the Fox News Channel. Garrett left Fox News on September 3, 2010, to join National Journal. His final day on Fox News was on America Live with Megyn Kelly. At that time he was also a frequent guest commentator on MSNBC and on CBS's Face the Nation.

It was announced on Face the Nation on November 18, 2012, that Garrett would be joining CBS News as Chief White House Correspondent. He was named CBS News Chief Washington Correspondent in December 2018.

Garrett now hosts The Takeout, a weekly podcast about politics, public policy, and pop culture.

Controversies
In July 2015, Garrett made headlines when he asked Obama during a press conference why he was "content" with the Iran Nuclear Deal that left four Americans—Amir Mirza Hekmati, Jason Rezaian, Saeed Abedini, and Robert Levinson—trapped in Iran. The President admonished Garrett by saying, "I’ve got to give you credit, Major, for how you craft those questions. The notion that I am 'content' as I celebrate with American citizens languishing in Iranian jails, Major, that's nonsense, and you should know better. Now, if the question is why we did not tie the negotiations to their release, think about the logic that creates. Suddenly, Iran realizes, 'You know what? Maybe we can get additional concessions out of the Americans by holding these individuals. While other Americans held by Iran were eventually released, Robert Levinson died while in Iranian custody.

Personal life
Garrett is married to Lara Brown and lives with his family in Washington, D.C.

Bibliography
 
 Common Cents (Little, Brown, 1995)
 The Fifteen Biggest Lies in Politics (St. Martin's Griffin, 2000)
 The Enduring Revolution: How the Contract with America Continues to Shape the Nation (Crown Forum, 2005)
 The Enduring Revolution: The Inside Story of the Republican Ascendancy and Why It Will Continue (Three Rivers Press, 2006)
Mr. Trump's Wild Ride: The Thrills, Chills, Screams, and Occasional Blackouts of an Extraordinary Presidency (St. Martin's Press, 2018)
 The Big Truth: Upholding Democracy in the Age of "The Big Lie" (with David Becker) (Diversion Books, 2022)

See also 
 White House press corps

References

External links
 
 Major Garrett at CBS News
  at Fox News
 
 

1962 births
Living people
People from San Diego
Journalists from California
American male non-fiction writers
CBS News people
Fox News people
CNN people
The Washington Times people
Missouri School of Journalism alumni